Christian Sansam (born 26 December 1975) is an English retired professional footballer who played as a midfielder.

Playing career
Born in Hull, Sansam played in the Football League for Scunthorpe United, Scarborough, Bradford City and Hull City, and in Singapore for Woodlands Wellington. While a Scunthorpe United player, Sansam spent a month on loan to Halifax Town; he made five appearances in the Conference and scored once.

Later career
As of November 2020 Sansam is working as kitman for Peterborough United, having previously held the same role at Doncaster Rovers.

References

External links
Profile at On Cloud Seven

1975 births
Living people
Footballers from Kingston upon Hull
English footballers
Association football midfielders
Scunthorpe United F.C. players
Halifax Town A.F.C. players
Scarborough F.C. players
Bradford City A.F.C. players
Hull City A.F.C. players
Woodlands Wellington FC players
English Football League players
National League (English football) players
Peterborough United F.C. non-playing staff
Doncaster Rovers F.C. non-playing staff
English expatriate footballers
English expatriates in Singapore
Expatriate footballers in Singapore